Cochlosoma is a genus of flagellated protozoa in the order Trichomonadida created by A. Kotlán (1923). Some of their typical features include a prominent adhesive disc, axostyle, costa, and six flagella – one of which is attached to an undulating membrane that runs laterally along the body.

Cochlosoma species are parasites found in the intestines of birds and mammals. They are known to cause runting and enteritis in young turkey and ducks.

The genus currently contains five species, the most notable member being C. anatis, a parasite of ducks and turkeys.

History of knowledge 
Cochlosoma was first described by Kotlán (1923) to include C. anatis, a flagellate he found in the intestines of young European domestic ducks (Anas platyrhynchos) suffering from coccidiosis. Cochlosoma rostratum was identified in North American domestic ducks by Kimura in 1934, although this species is now recognized as a synonym of C.anatis1. 

Kimura was the first to describe the morphology of Cochlosoma in great detail. A second species was described under the name Cyanthosoma striatum (Tyzzer, 1930) and was reassigned as Cochlosoma striatum by Kulda and Nohýnková (1978)2. In 1938, Bernard V. Travis described two new species of Cochlosoma, C. picae and C. turdi. The most recent addition to genus Cochlosoma is C. soricis, which was found in shrews by Watkins et al. (1989)3.

Cochlosoma was originally proposed to be part of diplomonads because their prominent adhesive disc is similar to that of Giardia1. In 1952, Grassé placed the genus into the order Retortamonadida5. However, morphological and ultrastructural observations (i.e. parabasal apparatus, pelta, costa, and axostyle) suggest the genus is more likely related to trichomonads and in 1996, Pecka et al. moved Cochlosoma to order Trichomonadida4. More recently, analysis of their rRNA gene sequence further supported their placement in Trichomonadida and led to their transfer from family Cochlosomatidae to family Trichomonadidae5.

Hosts 
Cochlosoma species are parasitic and commonly found in the cloaca, large intestine, and ceca1. The following are some species and their known hosts:
 C. anatis: reported in ducks and turkeys and has been experimentally transmitted to chickens1,6
 C. picae: magpie (pica hudsonia)1
 C. turdi: American robin (turdus migratorius)1
 C. striatum: ruffled grouse (Bonasa umbelus)7
 C. sorecis: Shrews3
 Cochlosoma sp.: American magpies, eastern robins, bobwhite quail, songbirds, waterfowl, blue-faced parrot-finch, zebra finch, painted finch, nutmeg manikin, double-barred finch, red-headed parrot-finches, Bengalese finches, Lady Gould finches, and bats3,7,8,9

Morphology 
Cochlosoma species have asymmetrical ovoidal shaped bodies (6-18 µm) that are broader anteriorly and narrower posteriorly. Their anterior end is truncated by a spiraled adhesive disc that is used to attach to the intestinal mucosa of the host. A lateral groove develops along the side of the body from the disc.

Six flagella of varying lengths arise from the anterior end of the cell. A recurrent flagellum is attached to the cell body by an undulating membrane and is free at the posterior end. The undulating membrane travels along the lateral groove and is supported by a conspicuous costa with type B periodicity. Four flagella are free and emerge anterolaterally from the lateral groove. The sixth flagellum emerges from a basal body the dorsal side of the body, independent of the basal body complex of the other flagella. Fibrillar appendages arise from the basal bodies. An axostyle also originates near the anterior basal bodies, passes through the body of the cell, and protrudes posteriorly.

They are uninucleate and their nucleus can range from spherical to slightly oblong. The nucleus is situated near the centre of the body. A parabasal apparatus, composed of a golgi complex and a single parabasal fiber, can be found near the anterior side of the nucleus. Double membrane bound organelles similar to hydrogenosomes are present in the cytoplasm. Cochlosoma species are often distinguished by their differences in size and the presence or absence of cytoplasmic granules.1,3,4,9

Life cycle 
Little is known about Cochlosoma life cycles and much of what is known has been observed in C. anatis. Reproduction occurs by longitudinal binary fission in the trophozite stage. A pseudocyst stage has been recorded and may be the form taken during transmission via the fecal-oral route.7,8

Practical importance 
Infection of Cochlosoma species has also been associated with runting and catarrhal enteritis in wild and domestic turkey poults and ducklings1,10. Most observed cases of infection in adult finches are subclinical11.

Cochlosoma attach themselves onto the host via suction which leaves microscopic lesions and swelling on the surface epithelium10. Although there are many cases in which Cochlosoma species have been found to be the main pathogen, they are often found in conjunction with Coccidia, Salmonella, and Hexamita1. The most notable case directly associated with Cochlosoma occurred in Scotland in 1945 when an outbreak resulted in severe enteritis and high mortality rates in turkey poults. Large numbers of Cochlosoma were found in the duodenum and jejunum of the birds10.

Outbreaks of Cochlosoma can be prevented by reducing overcrowding and environmental contamination. Infection can be effectively treated with metronidazole or ronidazole.7,11

List of species 
Genus Cochlosoma currently includes 5 species:
 Cochlosoma anatis Kotlan, 1925
 Cochlosoma striatum Tyzzer, 1930
 Cochlosoma picae Travis, 1938
 Cochlosoma turdi  Travis, 1938
 Cochlosoma sorecis [[Watkins, O'Dell, & Pinter 1989

References 
1 Travis, B.V. 1938: A synopsis of the flagellate Genus Cochlosoma Kotlan with the dexcription of two new species. J. Parasitol. 24: 343-351. doi: 10.2307/3272444

2 Williams, R.B. 2013: Nomenclatural and bibliographical notes on new taxa of protozoan parasites described by Ernest Edward Tyzzer (1875–1965). Zoological Bibliography. 2(4): 131-142

3 Watkins, R.A., O’Dell, W.D., and Pinter, A.J. 1989: Redescription of flagellar arrangement in the duck intestinal flagellate, Cochlosoma anatis and description of a new species, Cochlosoma soricis N. Sp. From Shrews. J. Protozool. 36(6): 527-532

4 Pecka, Z., Nohynkova, E., and Kulda, J. 1996: Ultrastructure of Cochlosoma anatis Kotlan, 1923 and taxonomic position of the family Cochlosomatidae (Parabasala: Trichomonadida). Eur. J. Protistol. 32: 190-201. doi: 10.1016/S0932-4739(96)80019-8

5 Hampl, V., Vrlik, M., Cepicka, I., Pecka, Z., Kulda, J., and Tachezy, J. 2006: Affiliation of Cochlosoma to trichomonads confirmed by phylogenetic analysis of the small-subunit rRNA gene and a new family concept of the order Trichomonadida. Int. J. Syst. Evol. Microbiol. 56: 305-312. doi: 10.1099/ijs.0.63754-0

6 Lindsay, D.S., Larsen, C.T., Zajac, A.M., and Pierson, F.W. 1999: Experimental Cochlosoma anatis infections in poultry. Vet. Paristol. 81(1): 21-27

7 Baker, D.G. 2007. Flynn's parasites of laboratory animals (2nd ed.). Ames (USA): Blackwell Publishing 219-220 p.

8 Evans, N.P., Evans, R.D., Fitz-Coy, S., Pierson, F.W., Robertson, J.L., and Lindsay, D.S. 2006: Identificatiton of the new morphological and life-cycle stages of Cochlosoma anatis and experimental transmission using pseudocyst. Avian Dis. 50: 22-27

9 Cochlosoma A. Kotlan, 1923 – Overview [Internet]. Encyclopedia of Life; [cited 2017 Mar 27]. Available from http://eol.org/pages/92136/overview

10 Cooper, G.L., Shivaprasad, H.L., Bickford, A.A, Nordhausen, R., Munn R.J and Jeffrey, J.S. 1995: Enteritis in turkeys associated with an unusual flagellated protozoan. Avian Dis. 39(1): 183-190. doi: 10.2307/1592001

11 Filippich, L.J. & O’Donoghue, P.J. 1997: Cochlosoma infections in finches. Aust Vet J. 75(8): 561-563

Metamonads